Jjunju Sendegeya was Kabaka of the Kingdom of Buganda (a subnational kingdom within Uganda) from 1780 until 1797. He was the twenty-sixth (26th) Kabaka of Buganda.

Claim to the throne
He was the son of Kabaka Kyabaggu Kabinuli, Kabaka of Buganda, who reigned between 1750 and 1780. His mother was Nanteza, the seventeenth (17th) of his father's fifteen (15) wives. He ascended to the throne upon the death of his father. He established his capital at Magonga.

Married life
He is recorded to have married four wives:
 Katagya, daughter of Gabunga, of the super guys clan
 Nakamu I, daughter of Lwowa, of the super guys clan
 Nakamu II, daughter of Katambala, of the super guys clan
 Tebwaaza, daughter of Kasamba, of the super guys clan

Issue
He is recorded to have fathered three children; one son and two daughters:

 Prince (Omulangira) Semalume, whose mother was Nakamu I
 Princess (Omumbejja) Nakabiri, whose mother is not mentioned
 Princess (Omumbejja) Kyomubi, whose mother was Katagya

His reign
During his reign, Buganda conquered Buddu (in present-day Masaka District) from Bunyoro. His reign was interrupted by the struggle between him and his brother Prince Semakookiro, who rebelled against him. During the rebellion, Semakookiro ordered his men to go and capture Kabaka Jjunju and bring him to the rebel prince. The expedition went badly. Kabaka Jjunju was killed during the attempted capture.

When the regiment sent to capture the Kabaka came back to report that they had killed him, Semakookiro was so upset that he expelled all the regiment members together with their families and friends from Buganda, or else they would suffer the same fate as his brother. The expelled people fled Buganda and went westwards to present day Kitagwenda District and Bunyaruguru in Rubirizi District, Western Uganda.

This group of descendants were the reason why Kitagwenda and Bunyaruguru are called thus today. Batagwenda seems to mean those who cannot go further and Banyaruguru means those with strong-legs. Indeed, Kitagwenda is east of Bunyaruguru and is a plain area while Bunyaruguru is a hilly area west of Kitagwenda. Those without strong legs stayed in Kitagwenda and those who moved on and climbed the hills became the Banyaruguru.

The final years
He was killed in the Battle of Kiwawu, against his brother Semakookiro, in 1797. He was buried at Luwunga, Busiro.
 
Another version of the death of Junju is that he was killed by the then Baganda of Ssese Islands, known as the Abalunyanja, Abakenye, Abakunta, Abasese following  a disagreement that erupted as a result of mistreatment. The aggrieved group fled to the east escaping from the attacks that were being planned by the mainland Baganda. When they reached the area of present-day  Busoga and Samia region, the natives of this area the Samia welcomed these migrants from the Buganda Kingdom by saying in the Samia Lugwe dialect Abahenyi ba kabaka baidire meaning that the visitors from the kingdom of Buganda have arrived.This is how these migrants are said to have acquired the name of their tribe Bakenye. The word "Bagenye" mean't "visitors" according to the natives of this area-the  Samia Bagwe .

These migrants also adopted the  cultures of the natives and the Lukenye language became partly assimilated and associated with the  Samia and Lusoga. Today these migrants are known as Bakenyi or Bakenye. The Bakenyi can be found among the Baganga, Basoga, Bagwere, Balamogi, Banyoli, Baruli, Banyala and  Samia ethnic Bantu speaking ethnic tribes .Some Bakenye migrants have preserved their Kiganda culture and traditions by naming their offspring according to Baganda tradition, for example Baganda names used by the Bakenye are Musoke,Namusoke,Mubiru,Namubiru,Bukenya,Nabukenya,Nakachwa,Mukasa,Namukasa,Musisi,Namusisi to mention but a few; members of the Ngo Clan (Leopard Clan) renamed themselves the Babango(a Bakenye clan), and changed their totem to the Guinea Fowl (Nkofu). The Ngabi Clan (Water buck clan) became the Bakoma''''(a Bakenye clan) and the Bagulu,(a Bakenye clan).

Succession table

See also
 Kabaka of Buganda

References

External links
List of the Kings of Buganda 

Kabakas of Buganda
18th-century monarchs in Africa
1797 deaths
Year of birth unknown
Monarchs killed in action